Complete list of past and present cast members of the German soap opera Verbotene Liebe.


Main cast

Recurring cast and guest appearances

References

Cast members
Verbotene Liebe